Valerian (Valeriana officinalis, Caprifoliaceae) is a perennial flowering plant native to Europe and Asia. It is consumed as food by the larvae of some Lepidoptera (butterfly and moth) species, including the grey pug.

Crude extract of valerian root may have sedative and anxiolytic effects, and is commonly sold in dietary supplement capsules to promote sleep, but there is insufficient clinical evidence that it is effective for this purpose. Its roots and leaves cause a catnip-like response in cats.

History

Valerian has been used as a herb in traditional medicine since at least the time of ancient Greece and Rome. Hippocrates described its properties, and Galen later prescribed it as a remedy for insomnia. In medieval Sweden, it was sometimes placed in the wedding clothes of the groom to ward off the "envy" of the elves. In the 16th century, Pilgram Marpeck prescribed valerian tea for a sick woman.

John Gerard's Herball, or Generall Historie of Plantes, first published in 1597, states that his contemporaries found valerian "excellent for those burdened and for such as be troubled with croup and other like convulsions, and also for those that are bruised with falls." He says that the dried root was valued as a medicine by the poor in the north of England and the south of Scotland, such that "no brothes, pottages or phisicalle meates are woorth [worth] anything if Setwall [valerian] were not at one end."

The 17th century astrological botanist Nicholas Culpeper thought the plant was "under the influence of Mercury, and therefore hath a warming faculty." He recommended both herb and root, and said that "the root boiled with liquorice, raisons and aniseed is good for those troubled with cough. Also, it is of special value against the plague, the decoction thereof being drunk and the root smelled. The green herb being bruised and applied to the head taketh away pain and pricking thereof."

Etymology and common names

The name of the herb is derived from the personal name Valeria and the Latin verb valere (to be strong, healthy). Other names used for this plant include garden valerian (to distinguish it from other Valeriana species), garden heliotrope (although not related to Heliotropium), setwall and all-heal (which is also used for plants in the genus Stachys). Red valerian, often grown in gardens, is also sometimes referred to as "valerian", but is a different species (Centranthus ruber), from the same family but not very closely related. It is also called cat's love for its catnip-like effects.

Valerian extract

Phytochemicals 
Known compounds detected in valerian include:
 Alkaloids: actinidine, chatinine, shyanthine, valerianine, and valerine
 Isovaleramide may be created in the extraction process.
 Gamma-aminobutyric acid (GABA)
 Isovaleric acid
 Iridoids, including valepotriates: isovaltrate and valtrate
 Sesquiterpenes (contained in the volatile oil): valerenic acid, hydroxyvalerenic acid and acetoxyvalerenic acid
 Flavanones: hesperidin, 6-methylapigenin, and linarin

Potential mechanism
Because of valerian's historical use in traditional medicine for diverse purposes, such as for sedation or pain relief, laboratory research has been directed at the GABAA receptor, a class of receptors on which benzodiazepines act. Valeric acid, which is responsible for the typical odor of mostly older valerian roots, does not have any sedative properties. Valproic acid, a widely prescribed anticonvulsant, is a derivative of valeric acid.  

Valerian also contains isovaltrate, which has been shown to be an inverse agonist for adenosine A1 receptor sites. Hydrophilic extractions of the herb commonly sold over the counter, however, probably do not contain significant amounts of isovaltrate. Valerenic acid in valerian stimulates GABAA and serotonin receptors as a positive allosteric modulator and partial agonist, respectively.  This includes the 5-HT5A which is implicated in the sleep-wake cycle.

Preparation 

The chief constituent of valerian is a yellowish-green to brownish-yellow oil present in the dried root, varying in content from 0.5 to 2.0%. This variation in quantity may be determined by location; a dry, stony soil yields a root richer in oil than moist, fertile soil.

Traditional medicine

Although valerian is a common traditional medicine used for treating insomnia, there is no good evidence it is effective for this purpose. Valerian has not been shown to be helpful in treating restless leg syndrome or anxiety.

The European Medicines Agency (EMA) approved the health claim that valerian can be used as a traditional herb to relieve mild nervous tension and to aid sleep; the EMA stated that although there is insufficient evidence from clinical studies, its effectiveness as a dried extract is considered plausible.

The American Academy of Sleep Medicine's 2017 clinical practice guidelines recommended against the use of valerian in the treatment of insomnia due to poor effectiveness and low quality of evidence.

Oral forms 

Oral forms are available in both standardized and unstandardized forms. Standardized products may be preferable considering the wide variation of the chemicals in the dried root, as noted above. When standardized, it is done so as a percentage of valerenic acid or valeric acid. In commonly used doses, valerian is recognized as GRAS in the United States.

Adverse effects 
Because the compounds in valerian produce central nervous system depression, they should not be used with other depressants, such as ethanol (drinking alcohol), benzodiazepines, barbiturates, opiates, kava, or antihistamine drugs.

As an unregulated product, the concentration, contents, and potential contaminants in valerian preparations cannot be easily determined. Because of this uncertainty and the potential for toxicity in the fetus and hepatotoxicity in the mother, valerian use is discouraged during pregnancy. Headache and diarrhea have occurred among subjects using valerian in clinical studies.

Effect on cats
Valerian root is a cat attractant in a way similar to catnip. Its roots and leaves are one of three alternatives for the one-third of domesticated or medium-sized cats who do not feel the effects of catnip.

Floral asymmetry 
Valerian is unusual in having flowers with "handedness", that is, having neither radial nor bilateral symmetry.

Invasive species
Valerian is considered an invasive species in many jurisdictions outside its natural range, including the US state of Connecticut where it is officially banned, and in New Brunswick, Canada, where it is listed as a plant of concern.

Image gallery

See also

Orvietan
Spikenard
Corvalol

Notes

References

External links
Valerian, National Center for Complementary and Integrative Health, US National Institutes of Health, October 2020

Valeriana
Cat attractants
CYP3A4 inhibitors
Medicinal plants
Anxiolytics
Flora of Asia
Flora of Europe
Flora of Azerbaijan
Flora of Armenia
Flora of China
Flora of Denmark
Flora of Estonia
Flora of Finland
Flora of Georgia (country)
Flora of Germany
Flora of Great Britain
Flora of Greece
Flora of Ireland
Flora of Italy
Flora of Japan
Flora of Latvia
Flora of Lithuania
Flora of Norway
Flora of Portugal
Flora of Romania
Flora of Russia
Flora of Spain
Flora of Iran
Flora of Turkey
Plants described in 1753
Taxa named by Carl Linnaeus
GABAA receptor positive allosteric modulators